Three Rivers Community Schools is a school district in Three Rivers, Michigan, United States. The superintendent is Nikki Nash

It operates the following schools:

Three Rivers High School
Three Rivers Middle School 
Andrews Elementary School
Norton Elementary School
Park Elementary School
Ruth Hoppin Elementary School

External links

School districts in Michigan
Education in St. Joseph County, Michigan